Theosis may refer to:
 Divinization (Christian)
 Exaltation (Mormonism), (Church of Jesus Christ of Latter-day Saints) refers to the process of becoming a God through the Atonement of Jesus Christ.
 Theosis (Eastern Orthodox theology), the process of coming into union with God